Melancton Smith  (May 24, 1810 – July 19, 1893) was a United States Navy officer who served during the Seminole Wars and the American Civil War.

Early life
Melancton Smith III was born in Jamaica, Long Island in New York, the son of Col. Melancton Smith, Jr., an army officer during the War of 1812, and grandson of Melancton Smith, a Continental Congressman. The third Melancton joined the U.S. Navy at a young age.

Civil War service
He also took part in the battles for Forts Jackson and St. Philip in April 1862. He was appointed captain and took part in the naval part of the Siege of Port Hudson in May to July, 1863. Smith was senior naval officer of a small fleet in Albemarle Sound where he attacked the Confederate ram  at the Battle of Albemarle Sound in May 1864.

He was in command of the frigate  during both attacks on Fort Fisher in December 1864 and January 1865. In Real Admiral David Dixon Porter's, Report to the U. S. Navy, dated January 28, 1865, from his flagship , on the Cape Fear River, in commendation of officers of his command the North Atlantic Squadron, the following was written about Melancton Smith:

Post Civil War
After the war Smith was chief of the Bureau of Equipment and Recruiting in the Department of the Navy from September 17, 1866, to July 17, 1870. He was then in charge of the New York Naval Shipyard at Brooklyn, New York, until his retirement on May 24, 1871. Smith died in Green Bay, Wisconsin. He is buried in Woodlawn Cemetery in Green Bay.

Appointments and ranks
Midshipman – March 1, 1826
Passed midshipman – April 28, 1832
Lieutenant – March 8, 1837
Commander – September 14, 1855
Captain – July 16, 1862
Commodore – July 25, 1866
Real admiral – July 1, 1870
added to retired list – May 24, 1871

See also

References
Notes

Bibliography
 Eicher, John H., and Eicher, David J., Civil War High Commands, Stanford University Press, 2001, .

1810 births
1893 deaths
Union Navy officers
United States Navy officers
Military personnel from New York City
People of New York (state) in the American Civil War